In physics, field strength is the magnitude of a vector-valued field (e.g., in volts per meter, V/m, for an electric field E). 
For example, an electromagnetic field results in both electric field strength and magnetic field strength.
As an application, in radio frequency telecommunications, the signal strength excites a receiving antenna and thereby induces a voltage at a specific frequency and polarization in order to provide an input signal to a radio receiver. Field strength meters are used for such applications as cellular, broadcasting, wi-fi and a wide variety of other radio-related applications.

See also
 Dipole field strength in free space
 Field strength tensor
 Signal strength in telecommunications

References

Electromagnetism
Physical quantities